Are You the One? A Global Matchmaking Competition is the ninth season of the reality dating series Are You the One?. It was filmed in Gran Canaria, Spain and premiered on January 18, 2023. 

Moving from MTV, this is the first season to air on Paramount+, with  ITV Netherlands taking over production from Lighthearted Entertainment, and the first to feature Kamie Crawford as its host, replacing Terrence J.

Cast

Progress 

 = Unconfirmed perfect match

Notes

Truth Booths

Episodes

References

Are You the One?
2023 American television seasons